Torch of the Mystics is the fourth studio album by American experimental rock band Sun City Girls. The 1990 LP cover released on Majora differs from the 1993 CD reissue by Tupelo.

Recording history 
Most of the album was recorded on an 8-track at a home in Tempe, Arizona in 1988. The band took much of their inspiration from Alan Bishop's field recordings.

Release and reception
Torch of the Mystics was originally issued by Majora Records solely on vinyl format in 1990. However, due to its compressed and tinny sounding production, the album was remastered and re-released by Tupelo Records in 1993.

Noting its "swirling, psychedelic ethnic forgeries that will make Can fans renounce post-Landed Kraut Rock wax", Byron Coley wrote in Spin that the album "is easily the richest, lumpiest puddle of guh they've yet emitted."

Since its release, the album has received critical acclaim from websites such as Allmusic and Pitchfork.

Track listing

Sources

The song "The Shining Path" is cover of the Bolivian song "Llorando se fue," recorded by Los Kjarkas in 1981.

In popular culture
The song "Lariat" by Stephen Malkmus and the Jicks mentions the album.

Personnel
Adapted from the Torch of the Mystics liner notes.
Sun City Girls
 Alan Bishop – bass guitar, vocals
 Richard Bishop – guitar, vocals
 Charles Gocher – drums, percussion, vocals

Release history

References

External links 
 

1990 albums
Sun City Girls albums
Psychedelic rock albums by American artists